SRL or S.R.L. may refer to:

 a designation equivalent to limited liability company, that may be appended to the end of company names:
 Società a responsabilità limitata (Italian)
 Sociedad de responsabilidad limitada (Spanish)
 Societate cu răspundere limitată (Romanian)
 Société à Responsabilité Limitée (French)
 Semantic role labeling, an activity of natural language processing
 Sarcalumenin, human protein that regulates calcium transport
 Shift register lookup table, a component in digital circuitry
 Student Rugby League, UK
 Semiconductor ring laser, a type of laser
 Statistical relational learning, a subdiscipline of artificial intelligence
 Suburban Rail Loop, a proposed rail line in Melbourne, Australia
 Survival Research Laboratories, a machine performance art group
 Self-regulated learning, a psychological concept related to metacognition
  (see Irish orthography#Abbreviations)
Stimulated Raman Loss, a sub-type of Stimulated Raman spectroscopy
Palo Verde Airport IATA code